Johor Circuit is the motorsport race track in Johor, Malaysia. It was the first motosport track in Malaysia located in Pasir Gudang.

History
The construction of the circuit began in 1985 and was officially opened on 1986 by Sultan Iskandar. In 1998, it underwent another development. In 2015, Sultan Ibrahim Ismail announced that the circuit would be redeveloped. In 2016, the new design plan was presented with a cost of US$800 million.

Events
The circuit hosted the Malaysian motorcycle Grand Prix back in 1998, as well as two races of the Superbike World Championship in 1992 and 1993.

The Asian Festival of Speed, comprising the Asian Touring Car Championship and the Asian Formula 2000 series, used to host its events at Johor Circuit in the early 2000s. In 2003, Asian Formula 2000 was replaced by Formula BMW Asia and is joined by Porsche Carrera Cup Asia for the event.

Lap records

The official race lap records at the Johor Circuit are listed as:

See also
 Sport in Malaysia
 List of tourist attractions in Johor

References

External websites
Official Johor Circuit Facebook page

 
1986 establishments in Malaysia
Defunct motorsport venues